Patriotism is a 1918 American silent drama film directed by Raymond B. West and starring Bessie Barriscale, Charles Gunn and Herschel Mayall. It is set in a Scottish nursing hospital during World War I.

Cast
 Bessie Barriscale as Robin Cameron
 Charles Gunn as John Hamilton
 Herschel Mayall as Sidney Carson
 Arthur Allardt as Dr. Hyde
 Joseph J. Dowling as Sir Angus Cameron
 Mary Jane Irving as Mimi
 Ida Lewis as Mrs. MacTavish
 Clifford Alexander as Donald Cameron

References

Bibliography
 Paul M. Edwards. World War I on Film: English Language Releases through 2014. McFarland, 2016.

External links
 

1918 films
1918 drama films
1910s English-language films
American silent feature films
Silent American drama films
American black-and-white films
Films directed by Raymond B. West
Films distributed by W. W. Hodkinson Corporation
Films set in Scotland
American World War I films
1910s American films